The Albatros L 69 was a two-seat German parasol monoplane racing and training aircraft of 1925. It was a single-engine parasol-wing monoplane of conventional configuration that seated the pilot and passenger in tandem, open cockpits. It was advertised as a trainer, however contemporary reports dismissed this due to the difficulty in accessing the front cockpit, and the designers' focus on performance.

Operational history
In 1925, the Albatros test pilot Kurt Ungewitter won Class D in the Deutsche Rundflug ("Round Germany") in an L 69a, but was killed in one in a crash two years later.
The "Round-Saxony" flight Class D was won by a Bristol Lucifer-engined Albatros L.69, piloted by a student at an average speed of 165 km/h.

Variants
 L 69 – two examples with Bristol Lucifer engine
 L 69a – two examples with Siemens-Halske Sh 12 engine

Specifications (L 69a)

See also

References

Notes

Bibliography
 
 German Aircraft between 1919–1945
 bungartz.nl
 Flight magazine 29 October 1925 on Albatros L.69 12

Single-engined tractor aircraft
Parasol-wing aircraft
1920s German civil trainer aircraft
L 069